Henning A. Blomen (September 28, 1910 – July 14, 1993) was an American politician who was candidate for United States President of the Socialist Labor Party of America in 1968 and for Vice President in 1964. Blomen was also an unsuccessful candidate for Governor of Massachusetts 14 times. According to his obituary in the Boston Globe, Henning advocated a bloodless revolution, abolishment of capitalism and the establishment of a socialist industrial republic.

Blomen was born in New Bedford, Massachusetts in September 1910. He was married twice. His first marriage was to Margaret (Kay) Elwell, ( www.margaretkaypoet.com ) originally from Eastport Maine, and with whom he had one daughter, Frances (Blomen) Tripp. His second marriage in 1969 was to Connie Zimmerman who went on to be the SLP Vice Presidential candidate in 1976. 

He worked as a machine assembler shipper for a coffee importer and later at a chemical plant in Cambridge, Massachusetts, where he was employed for more than 25 years. Henning died at a nursing home in North Reading, Massachusetts in July 1993 at the age of 82, was cremated and his ashes were scattered behind a private residence on Water Row Rd. in Sudbury, Massachusetts.

References 
 
https://www.margaretkaypoet.com
https://www.thehenryford.org/collections-and-research/digital-collections/artifact/422463#slide=gs-364439

External links 
 1953 video recording of Blomen on YouTube

1910 births
1993 deaths
1964 United States vice-presidential candidates
20th-century American politicians
Candidates in the 1968 United States presidential election
Politicians from New Bedford, Massachusetts
Socialist Labor Party of America politicians from Massachusetts
Socialist Labor Party of America presidential nominees
Socialist Labor Party of America vice presidential nominees